Monte Cristo Natural Area Preserve in Klickitat County, Washington is part of the Washington Natural Areas Program.  It protects  in the eastern Cascade Mountains owned by the Washington Department of Natural Resources. The landscape includes grand fir and Douglas fir forest, dry grassland, and shrubland with patches of Oregon white oak - Frémont silktassel chaparral.

References

Washington Natural Areas Program
Protected areas of Klickitat County, Washington